Svetloozyorskoye is a rural locality (a selo) and the administrative center of Svetloozyorsky Selsoviet, Biysky District, Altai Krai, Russia. The population was 1,141 as of 2013. There are 18 streets.

Geography 
Svetloozyorskoye is located 30 km east of Biysk (the district's administrative centre) by road. Maloyeniseyskoye is the nearest rural locality.

References 

Rural localities in Biysky District